All Hail West Texas is the sixth studio album by the Mountain Goats. After the slight increase in production values on The Coroner's Gambit album of 2000, All Hail West Texas was the last Mountain Goats album recorded entirely on John Darnielle's trademark Panasonic RX-FT500 boombox until 2020's Songs for Pierre Chuvin. Similarly, it marked the end of an era for the band, as it was the last album by the Mountain Goats to feature only John Darnielle until 2020.

The cover states that the album consists of "fourteen songs about seven people, two houses, a motorcycle, and a locked treatment facility for adolescent boys."

Several songs were written to appear on the record that were not included in its final version. Three were given away on the Tiny Mix Tapes website ("Song for God", "Warm Lonely Planet", and "Waco"). Darnielle said there was a full set of fifteen outtakes that he intended to release for free one day, but he destroyed them after hearing about the leak of Hail and Farewell, Gothenburg. It is not known whether that set included the three listed above.

When the promotional copies of this album were sent out, a unique General Highway Map of a part of West Texas was included in the mailing. Apparently, this was not acknowledged by any of the critics who received it.

In May 2013, Darnielle announced that Merge Records would reissue All Hail West Texas on July 23 of that year, on vinyl for the first time. The announcement included a link to an explanatory essay by Matt Fraction. The reissue includes remastered versions of the original recordings, seven previously unreleased tracks contemporary to the original album, and a new 1,800-word essay by Darnielle about the album and his writing process.

Reception
All Hail West Texas was well received by critics compared to other albums created by the Mountain Goats. Critics point out the use of the Panasonic RX-FT500 and how the album had a more raw sound than a studio recording. It is also mentioned that the "wheel grind" of the tape recorder itself is heard throughout the album. Some of the album's critics hold that the general direction of the album is hard to follow. The 2013 reissue was given the title of "Best New Reissue" by Pitchfork Media.

Podcast
This album has been the focus of the first season of the I Only Listen to the Mountain Goats podcast hosted by John Darnielle and Welcome to Night Vale writer Joseph Fink. Each episode also features an original cover version of a song, which was released as a compilation available for purchase on Merge's website under the title I Only Listen To The Mountain Goats: All Hail West Texas

Track listing 
All lyrics and music by John Darnielle.

2013 reissue bonus tracks

References

External links 
 Complete lyrics to the album

2002 albums
The Mountain Goats albums